Mădălin Licuță Mihăescu (born 21 October 1988) is a Romanian professional footballer who plays as a defensive midfielder for CSA Steaua București.

Honours
Steaua București
Liga III: 2020–21

References

External links

 
 

1988 births
Living people
Romanian footballers
Association football midfielders
Liga I players
Liga II players
FC Dinamo București players
AFC Chindia Târgoviște players
FC Gloria Buzău players
ASC Daco-Getica București players
FC Politehnica Iași (2010) players
FC Petrolul Ploiești players
CSA Steaua București footballers
People from Drobeta-Turnu Severin